Semyonovsky Municipal Okrug, formerly Municipal Okrug #4, is a municipal okrug of Admiralteysky District of the federal city of St. Petersburg, Russia. Population:  

It borders the Fontanka River in the north, Gorokhovaya Street in the east, Obvodny Canal in the south, and Moskovsky Avenue in the west.

Places of interest include Vitebsky railway station and Saint Petersburg State Institute of Technology.

References

Admiralteysky District, Saint Petersburg